Gučkampis (formerly) is a village in Kėdainiai district municipality, in Kaunas County, in central Lithuania. According to the 2011 census, the village had a population of 24 people. There is an old cemetery.

History
An ancient stone axe have been found in Gučkampis. The village have been known since 1609.  It was a royal village in the 18th century. At that time it belonged to the marshall of Raseiniai Jurgis Liaudanskas.

In 1950–1954 and 1963–1968 Gučkampis was a selsovet center.

Demography

References

Villages in Kaunas County
Kėdainiai District Municipality